The 2020 Tennessee Tech Golden Eagles football team represented Tennessee Technological University as a member of Ohio Valley Conference (OVC) during the 2020–21 NCAA Division I FCS football season. Led by third-year head coach Dewayne Alexander, the Golden Eagles compiled an overall record of 2–5 overall with an identical mark in conference play, tying for sixth place in the OVC. Tennessee Tech played home games at Tucker Stadium in Cookeville, Tennessee.

Previous season

The Golden Eagles finished the 2019 season 6–6, 3–5 in OVC play to finish in a tie for fifth place.

Schedule
Tennessee Tech had games scheduled against Minnesota (September 12) and North Carolina Central (September 19), which were canceled before the start of the 2020 season.

References

Tennessee Tech
Tennessee Tech Golden Eagles football seasons
Tennessee Tech Golden Eagles football